Louis Malleret (1901–1970) was a French archaeologist. Malleret together with Paul Levy are credited with first reporting the archeological site An Son in Southern Vietnam.

References

1901 births
1970 deaths
French archaeologists
People from Clermont-Ferrand
20th-century archaeologists